In physics, a surface wave is a mechanical wave that propagates along the interface between differing media.  A common example is gravity waves along the surface of liquids, such as ocean waves.  Gravity waves can also occur within liquids, at the interface between two fluids with different densities.  Elastic surface waves can travel along the surface of solids, such as Rayleigh or Love waves.  Electromagnetic waves can also propagate as "surface waves" in that they can be guided along with a refractive index gradient or along an interface between two media having different dielectric constants. In radio transmission, a ground wave is a guided wave that propagates close to the surface of the Earth.

Mechanical waves

In seismology, several types of surface waves are encountered. Surface waves, in this mechanical sense, are commonly known as either Love waves (L waves) or Rayleigh waves. A seismic wave is a wave that travels through the Earth, often as the result of an earthquake or explosion. Love waves have transverse motion (movement is perpendicular to the direction of travel, like light waves), whereas Rayleigh waves have both longitudinal (movement parallel to the direction of travel, like sound waves) and transverse motion. Seismic waves are studied by seismologists and measured by a seismograph or seismometer. Surface waves span a wide frequency range, and the period of waves that are most damaging is usually 10 seconds or longer. Surface waves can travel around the globe many times from the largest earthquakes. Surface waves are caused when P waves and S waves come to the surface.

Examples are the waves at the surface of water and air (ocean surface waves).  Another example is internal waves, which can be transmitted along the interface of two water masses of different densities.

In theory of hearing physiology, the traveling wave (TW) of Von Bekesy, resulted from an acoustic surface wave of the basilar membrane into the cochlear duct. His theory purported to explain every feature of the auditory sensation owing to these passive mechanical phenomena. Jozef Zwislocki, and later David Kemp, showed that that is unrealistic and that active feedback is necessary.

Electromagnetic waves

Ground waves are radio waves propagating parallel to and adjacent to the surface of the Earth, following the curvature of the Earth.  This radiative ground wave is known as Norton surface wave, or more properly Norton ground wave, because ground waves in radio propagation are not confined to the surface. 

Another type of surface wave is the non-radiative, bound-mode Zenneck surface wave or Zenneck–Sommerfeld surface wave. The earth has one refractive index and the atmosphere has another, thus constituting an interface that supports the guided Zenneck wave's transmission. Other types of surface wave are the trapped surface wave, the gliding wave and Dyakonov surface waves (DSW) propagating at the interface of transparent materials with different symmetry.  Apart from these, various types of surface waves have been studied for optical wavelengths.

Microwave field theory
Within microwave field theory, the interface of a dielectric and conductor supports "surface wave transmission". Surface waves have been studied as part of transmission lines and some may be considered as single-wire transmission lines.

Characteristics and utilizations of the electrical surface wave phenomenon include:
 The field components of the wave diminish with distance from the interface.
 Electromagnetic energy is not converted from the surface wave field to another form of energy (except in leaky or lossy surface waves) such that the wave does not transmit power normal to the interface, i.e. it is evanescent along that dimension. 
 In optical fiber transmission, evanescent waves are surface waves. 
 In coaxial cable in addition to the TEM mode there also exists a transverse-magnetic (TM) mode which propagates as a surface wave in the region around the central conductor. For coax of common impedance this mode is effectively suppressed but in high impedance coax and on a single central conductor without any outer shield, low attenuation and very broadband propagation is supported. Transmission line operation in this mode is called E-Line.

Surface plasmon polariton

The surface plasmon polariton (SPP) is an electromagnetic surface wave that can travel along an interface between two media with different dielectric constants. It exists under the condition that the permittivity of one of the materials  forming the interface is negative, while the other one is positive, as is the case for the interface between air and a lossy conducting medium below the plasma frequency. The wave propagates parallel to the interface and decays exponentially vertical to it, a property called evanescence. Since the wave is on the boundary of a lossy conductor and a second medium, these oscillations can be sensitive to changes to the boundary, such as the adsorption of molecules by the conducting surface.

Sommerfeld–Zenneck surface wave

The Sommerfeld–Zenneck wave or Zenneck wave is a non-radiative guided electromagnetic wave that is supported by a planar or spherical interface between two homogeneous media having different dielectric constants. This surface wave propagates parallel to the interface and decays exponentially vertical to it, a property known as evanescence. It exists under the condition that the permittivity of one of the materials forming the interface is negative, while the other one is positive, as for example the interface between air and a lossy conducting medium such as the terrestrial transmission line, below the plasma frequency. Its electric field strength falls off at a rate of e-αd/√d in the direction of propagation along the interface due to two-dimensional geometrical field spreading at a rate of 1/√d, in combination with a frequency-dependent exponential attenuation (α), which is the terrestrial transmission line dissipation, where α depends on the medium’s conductivity. Arising from original analysis by Arnold Sommerfeld and Jonathan Zenneck of the problem of wave propagation over a lossy earth, it exists as an exact solution to Maxwell's equations. The Zenneck surface wave, which is a non-radiating guided-wave mode, can be derived by employing the Hankel transform of a radial ground current associated with a realistic terrestrial Zenneck surface wave source. Sommerfeld-Zenneck surface waves predict that the energy decays as R−1 because the energy distributes over the circumference of a circle and not the surface of a sphere. Evidence does not show that in radio space wave propagation, Sommerfeld-Zenneck surfaces waves are a mode of propagation as the path-loss exponent is generally between 20 dB/dec and 40 dB/dec.

See also
 Seismic waves
 Seismic communication
 P-waves
 S-waves
 Surface acoustic wave
 Sky waves, the primary means of HF transmission
 Surface plasmon, a longitudinal charge density wave along the interface of conducting and dielectric mediums
 Surface-wave-sustained mode, a propagation of electromagnetic surface waves.
 Evanescent waves and evanescent wave coupling
 Ocean surface waves, internal waves and crests, dispersion, and freak waves
 Love wave and Rayleigh–Lamb wave
 Gravity waves, occurs at certain natural interfaces (e.g. the atmosphere and ocean)
 Stoneley wave
 Scholte wave
 Dyakonov surface wave
People
Arnold Sommerfeld – published a mathematical treatise on the Zenneck wave
Jonathan Zenneck – Pupil of Sommerfeld; Wireless pioneer; developed the Zenneck wave
John Stone Stone – Wireless pioneer; produced theories on radio propagation
Other
 Ground constants, the electrical parameters of earth
 Near and far field, the radiated field that is within one quarter of a wavelength of the diffracting edge or the antenna and beyond.
 Skin effect, the tendency of an alternating electric current to distribute itself within a conductor so that the current density near the surface of the conductor is greater than that at its core.
 Surface wave inversion
 Green's function, a function used to solve inhomogeneous differential equations subject to boundary conditions.

References

Further reading

Standards and doctrines
 "Surface wave ". Telecom Glossary 2000, ATIS Committee T1A1, Performance and Signal Processing, T1.523–2001.
 "Surface wave", Federal Standard 1037C.
 "Surface wave", MIL-STD-188
 "Multi-service tactics, techniques, and procedures for the High-Frequency Automatic Link Establishment (HF-ALE): FM 6-02.74; MCRP 3–40.3E; NTTP 6-02.6; AFTTP(I) 3-2.48; COMDTINST M2000.7" Sept., 2003.

Books
 Barlow, H.M., and Brown, J., "Radio Surface Waves", Oxford University Press 1962.
 Budden, K. G., "Radio waves in the ionosphere; the mathematical theory of the reflection of radio waves from stratified ionised layers".  Cambridge, Eng., University Press, 1961. LCCN 61016040 /L/r85
 Budden, K. G., "The wave-guide mode theory of wave propagation". London, Logos Press; Englewood Cliffs, N.J., Prentice-Hall, c1961. LCCN 62002870 /L
 Budden, K. G., " The propagation of radio waves : the theory of radio waves of low power in the ionosphere and magnetosphere".  Cambridge (Cambridgeshire); New York : Cambridge University Press, 1985.  LCCN 84028498
 Collin, R. E., "Field Theory of Guided Waves". New York: Wiley-IEEE Press, 1990.
 Foti, S., Lai, C.G., Rix, G.J., and Strobbia, C., "“Surface Wave Methods for Near-Surface Site Characterization”", CRC Press, Boca Raton, Florida (USA), 487 pp., 2014 <https://www.crcpress.com/product/isbn/9780415678766>
 Sommerfeld, A., "Partial Differential Equations in Physics" (English version), Academic Press Inc., New York 1949, chapter 6 – "Problems of Radio".
 Polo, Jr., J. A., Mackay, T. G., and Lakhtakia, A., "Electromagnetic Surface Waves: A Modern Perspective". Waltham, MA, USA: Elsevier, 2013 <https://www.elsevier.com/books/electromagnetic-surface-waves/polo/978-0-12-397024-4>.
 Rawer, K.,"Wave Propagation in the Ionosphere", Dordrecht, Kluwer Acad.Publ. 1993.
 Sommerfeld, A., "Partial Differential Equations in Physics" (English version), Academic Press Inc., New York 1949, chapter 6 – "Problems of Radio".
 Weiner, Melvin M., "Monopole antennas" New York, Marcel Dekker, 2003. 
 Wait, J. R., "Electromagnetic Wave Theory", New York, Harper and Row, 1985.
 Wait, J. R., "The Waves in Stratified Media". New York: Pergamon, 1962.
 Waldron, Richard Arthur, "Theory of guided electromagnetic waves". London, New York, Van Nostrand Reinhold, 1970.  LCCN 69019848 //r86
 Weiner, Melvin M., "Monopole antennas" New York, Marcel Dekker, 2003.

Journals and papers
Zenneck, Sommerfeld, Norton, and Goubau
 J. Zenneck, (translators: P. Blanchin, G. Guérard, É. Picot), "Précis de télégraphie sans fil : complément de l'ouvrage : Les oscillations électromagnétiques et la télégraphie sans fil",  Paris : Gauthier-Villars, 1911. viii, 385 p. : ill. ; 26 cm. (Tr. "Precisions of wireless telegraphy:  complement of the work:  Electromagnetic oscillations and wireless telegraphy.")
 J. Zenneck, "Über die Fortpflanzung ebener elektromagnetischer Wellen längs einer ebenen Leiterfläche und ihre Beziehung zur drahtlosen Telegraphie", Annalen der Physik, vol. 23, pp. 846–866, Sept. 1907. (Tr. "About the propagation of electromagnetic plane waves along a conductor plane and their relationship to wireless telegraphy.")
 J. Zenneck, "Elektromagnetische Schwingungen und drahtlose Telegraphie", gart, F. Enke, 1905. xxvii, 1019 p. : ill. ; 24 cm. (Tr. "Electromagnetic oscillations and wireless telegraphy.")
 J. Zenneck, (translator: A.E. Seelig) "Wireless telegraphy,", New York [etc.] McGraw-Hill Book Company, inc., 1st ed. 1915. xx, 443 p. illus., diagrs. 24 cm. LCCN 15024534 (ed. "Bibliography and notes on theory" pp. 408–428.)
 A. Sommerfeld, "Über die Fortpflanzung elektrodynamischer Wellen längs eines Drahtes", Ann. der Physik und Chemie, vol. 67, pp. 233–290, Dec 1899. (Tr. "Propagation of electro-dynamic waves along a cylindric conductor.")
 A. Sommerfeld, "Über die Ausbreitung der Wellen in der drahtlosen Telegraphie", Annalen der Physik, Vol. 28, pp. 665–736, March  1909.  (Tr. "About the Propagation of waves in wireless telegraphy.")
 A. Sommerfeld, "Propagation of waves in wireless telegraphy," Ann. Phys., vol. 81, pp. 1367–1153, 1926.
 K. A. Norton, "The propagation of radio waves over the surface of the earth and in the upper atmosphere," Proc. IRE, vol. 24, pp. 1367–1387, 1936.
 K. A. Norton, "The calculations of ground wave field intensity over a finitely conducting spherical earth," Proc. IRE, vol. 29, pp. 623–639, 1941.
 G. Goubau, "Surface waves and their application to transmission lines," J. Appl. Phys., vol. 21, pp. 1119–1128; November,1950.
 G. Goubau, “Über die Zennecksche Bodenwelle,” (Tr."On the Zenneck Surface Wave."), Zeitschrift für Angewandte Physik, Vol. 3, 1951, Nrs. 3/4, pp. 103–107.

Wait
 Wait, J. R., "Lateral Waves and the Pioneering Research of the Late Kenneth A Norton".
 Wait, J. R., and D. A. Hill, "Excitation of the HF surface wave by vertical and horizontal apertures". Radio Science, 14, 1979, pp 767–780.
 Wait, J. R., and D. A. Hill, "Excitation of the Zenneck Surface Wave by a Vertical Aperture", Radio Science, Vol. 13, No. 6, November–December, 1978, pp. 969–977.
 Wait, J. R., "A note on surface waves and ground waves", IEEE Transactions on Antennas and Propagation, Nov 1965. Vol. 13, Issue 6, pp. 996–997 
 Wait, J. R., "The ancient and modern history of EM ground-wave propagation". IEEE Antennas Propagat. Mag., vol. 40, pp. 7–24, Oct. 1998.
 Wait, J. R., "Appendix C: On the theory of ground wave propagation over a slightly roughned curved earth", Electromagnetic Probing in Geophysics. Boulder, CO., Golem, 1971, pp. 37–381.
 Wait, J. R., "Electromagnetic surface waves", Advances in Radio Research, 1, New York, Academic Press, 1964, pp. 157–219.

Others
 R. E. Collin, "Hertzian Dipole Radiating Over a Lossy Earth or Sea: Some Early and Late 20th-Century Controversies", Antennas and Propagation Magazine, 46, 2004, pp. 64–79.
 F. J. Zucker, "Surface wave antennas and surface wave excited arrays", Antenna Engineering Handbook, 2nd ed., R. C. Johnson and H. Jasik, Eds. New York: McGraw-Hill, 1984.
 Yu. V. Kistovich, "Possibility of Observing Zenneck Surface Waves in Radiation from a Source with a Small Vertical Aperture", Soviet Physics Technical Physics, Vol. 34, No.4, April, 1989, pp. 391–394.
 V. I. Baĭbakov, V. N. Datsko, Yu. V. Kistovich, "Experimental discovery of Zenneck's surface electromagnetic waves", Sov Phys Uspekhi, 1989, 32 (4), 378–379.
 Corum, K. L. and J. F. Corum, "The Zenneck Surface Wave", Nikola Tesla, Lightning Observations, and Stationary Waves, Appendix II. 1994.
 M. J. King  and J. C. Wiltse, "Surface-Wave Propagation on Coated or Uncoated Metal Wires at Millimeter Wavelengths". J. Appl. Phys., vol. 21, pp. 1119–1128; November,
 M. J. King and J. C. Wiltse, "Surface-Wave Propagation on a Dielectric Rod of Electric Cross-Section." Electronic Communications, Inc., Tirnonium: kld. Sci. Rept.'No. 1, AFCKL Contract No. AF 19(601)-5475; August, 1960.
 T. Kahan and G. Eckart, "On the Electromagnetic Surface Wave of Sommerfeld", Phys. Rev. 76, 406–410 (1949).

Other media
  L.A. Ostrovsky (ed.), "Laboratory modeling and theoretical studies of surface wave modulation by a moving sphere", m, Oceanic and Atmospheric Research Laboratories, 2002. 

External links
 The Feynman Lectures on Physics: Surface waves
 Eric W. Weisstein, et al., "Surface Wave", Eric Weisstein's World of Physics, 2006.
 David Reiss, "Electromagnetic surface waves". The Net Advance of Physics: Special Reports, No. 1
 Gary Peterson, "Rediscovering the Zenneck wave". Feed Line No. 4. (ed''. reproduction available online at 21st Century Books)
 3D Waves by Jesse Nochella based on a program by Stephen Wolfram, Wolfram Demonstrations Project.

 
Radio frequency propagation
Broadcast engineering
Seismology